The Fremont Solstice Parade is an annual event that occurs each June in Seattle, Washington. 

The Parade was founded by Barbara Luecke and Peter Toms in 1989. Luecke and Toms were inspired by the Santa Barbara Summer Solstice Parade and Celebration. The Parade quickly grew to include thousands of participants and tens of thousands of spectators. The event is produced each June by the Fremont Arts Council (FAC), a non-profit organization based in the Fremont neighborhood of Seattle, Washington that supports the arts and artists in and around the city. The Parade kicks off the Fremont Fair, which for many years was a benefit for Solid Ground (originally known as the Fremont Public Association). 

The Fremont Solstice Parade is famous for its style and flair, political humor, energetic ensembles, and creative floats. It is also widely known for the body-painted Solstice Cyclists, who kick off the event each year by stripping nude and paint their bodies. The event is a slowly-paced music, dance and character procession where direct crowd interaction is encouraged and ensembles of actors in costume entertain with political and social commentary. 
 
The Fremont Solstice Pageant, a large-scale community play using over a hundred actors, musicians and giant puppets, was performed following the parade from 1997 to 2005 at the end of the parade route at Gas Works Park.

The Parade distinguishes itself from other mainstream parades with the following unusual rules:
 No printed words, signage or recognizable logos.
 No live animals (except guide animals).
 No motorized vehicles (except motorized wheelchairs)
 No functional weapons.

The 2022 parade is scheduled for Saturday June 18. The parade was cancelled from 2020-2021, as announced on April 16, 2020 by the Fremont Arts Council coronavirus pandemic.

See also
Arts in Seattle
Bohemianism
Culture jamming
Santa Barbara Summer Solstice Parade

Notes and references

External links

 Fremont Arts Council Homepage
 Parade Homepage

DIY culture
Clothing-optional events
Summer festivals
Pacific Northwest art
Festivals in Seattle
Culture of Seattle
Solstice Parade
Recurring events established in 1989
1989 establishments in Washington (state)
June events